News1, also known by its former name, News First Class (NFC), is an Israeli news website concentrating on investigative journalism. The website was established by investigative reporter Yoav Yitzhak, who is the chief editor and contributing journalist.

In 2011, Yitzhak returned to his former employer Maariv when the two signed an agreement in which the print newspaper will publish Yitzhak's investigative reporting.

References

External links
  

Israeli news websites